Magomedemin Nurutdinovich Gadzhiev (27 June 1961) is a Russian politician, the acting head of administration of the Kayakentsky District of the Republic of Dagestan. He has been awarded the rank of "The honored trainer of Russia".

Biography 
Magomedemin Gadzhiev was born on 27 June 1961 in the city of Krasnovodsk in the Turkmen Soviet Socialist Republic. He is a Kumyk national. He is married, and has three children.

Since 1975, Magomedemin has begun systematic sports activities, such as judo, in Makhachkala.

In 1979, he left Makhachkala Secondary School No.1.

From August to November 1979, he worked on Makhachkala Remzavod of Goskomselkhoztekhnika.

From 1979 to 1981, he serviced in the ranks of the Soviet Army (Airborne troops).

From 1981 to 1985, Magomedemin was a mechanic, a capstan lathe operator, a production supervisor No.1 of shop No.11 (which was released by the deputy secretary), and the committee of Komsomol (with the rights of a district committee).

From 1982 to 1988, Gadzhiev was a student of Dagestan State University.

From 1985 to 1989, he was the second secretary of Makhachkala and the town committee of Komsomol.

From 1989 to 1991, Magomedemin was the instructor of the ideological department of Makhachkala and the town committee of the Communist Party of the Soviet Union.

Since 1990, Magomedemin is the president of the Dagestan Federation of Martial Arts.

From 1994 to 2008, Gadzhiev was the GU of the Dagestan State Center of Martial Arts.

From January to December 2009, he was the head coach of national teams of Russia on taekwondo of TsSP Ministry Federal State Institution of sports tourism of Russia;

From 2010 to 2012, Magomedemin was the adviser to the Prime Minister of RD.

From 2012 to 2014, Magomedemin was a deputy of the chairman of the board at the President of RD on the development of physical culture and sport.

From 2013 to 2014, there was a magistracy passed on to the president of the Russian Federation at The Russian Academy of National Economy and Public Service across the direction of the "social design in system of the public and municipal administration".

From 18 April to 27 October 2014, Magomedemin was the acting head of administration of Sovetsky District in the city of Makhachkala;

Since 27 October 2014, Magomedemin is the acting head of administration of the Kayakentsky District in the Republic of Dagestan.

Links 
 Open Dagestan

References

1961 births
Living people
People from Türkmenbaşy
Russian Sunni Muslims
United Russia politicians
21st-century Russian politicians